The 9th constituency of Hérault is a French legislative constituency in the Hérault département.

It was created in the 2010 redistricting, with the first election in 2012.  It consists of
Canton of Mauguio and the Canton of Montpellier-4, and the communes
Lunel, Lunel-Viel, Marsillargues, Saint-Just, Saint-Nazaire-de-Pézan, Valergues.

Deputies

Election Results

2022

 
 
 
 
 
 
 
|-
| colspan="8" bgcolor="#E9E9E9"|
|-

2017

2012

References

9